Pierre Molinéris (Nice, 21 May 1920 - 7 February 2009) was a French professional road bicycle racer.

Major results

1942
Boucles de Sospel
1943
St.-Etienne - Le Puy
1944
Saint-Chamond
1945
Nice
1946
GP Vercors
Toulon
1947
Besançon
Nice - Puget - Théniers - Nice
1948
Circuit des Six Provinces
Firminy - Roanne - Firminy
Nice-Mont Agel
Nice - Puget - Théniers - Nice
Tour de Haute-Savoie
1949
Grenoble
Polymultipliée Lyonnaise
Firminy - Roanne - Firminy
1950
Boucles de l'Aulne
Circuit du Mont Blanc
Nantua
GP du Pneumatique
1951
GP de Thiers
Montluçon
Paris - St Amand Montrond
1952
Tour de France:
Winner stage 4
1953
Aurillac
Circuit du Mont Ventoux
Ussel
Circuit du Mont Blanc
1954
Circuit de la Vallée d'Ossau
Saint-Vallier
1955
GP du Pneumatique
Circuit du Mont Blanc

References

External links 

Official Tour de France results for Pierre Molinéris

1920 births
2009 deaths
Cyclists from Nice
French male cyclists
French Tour de France stage winners